Sitting on Snaps is an album by the Canadian indie rock duo Mecca Normal, released in 1995.

Production
Calvin Johnson produced a few of the album's tracks. Peter Jefferies played piano on "Cyclone" and "Vacant Night Sky", part of an effort to broaden the duo's sound beyond just Jean Smith's voice and David Lester's guitar. Jefferies would form Two-Foot Flame with Smith around the time of the album; he produced and played drums on Mecca Normal's next record, The Eagle and the Poodle.

Critical reception

Rolling Stone wrote: "Mecca Normal's approach is spare and self-contained, but long gone is the amateur primitivism of their folkish start; one might call this free punk, as avant and accomplished as its jazz counterpart." The Los Angeles Times called the band "an intriguing, consistently challenging force," writing that Smith's "hissing, melodramatic vocals, somewhere between Grace Slick, Patti Smith and a dental drill, slither and flail next to eerie guitar work, while [her] abstract lyrics provoke strong and disquieting images." 

The Santa Fe New Mexican thought that "the sound is amazingly full ... Smith's voice goes with the greatest of ease from slightly edgy to tortured animal." The Record opined that Smith and Lester "conjure some nice mood pieces in 'Trapped Inside Your Heart', 'Cyclone', and 'Vacant Night Sky'." SF Weekly wrote that "Smith's lyrics move from the overtly political to the elliptical; accordingly, her droning vocals occupy prettier soundscapes."

Option deemed the album "highly unlistenable." AllMusic wrote that Smith's vocals "are perhaps the strongest and most noticeable part of the combination this time around—she stretches her syllables out quite often, creating unsettled, overdubbed drones of sorts."

Track listing

Personnel
David Lester - guitar
Jean Smith - vocals

References

1995 albums
Matador Records albums